This is a list of films originally produced and/or distributed theatrically by the American independent film production and distribution company Neon.

Released

2010s

2020s

Upcoming

Undated films

Super LTD

References

External links
 Official website

Neon (distributor) films
Neon
Neon